Runner's diarrhea, also known as runner's colitis, the Indian shimmy or runner's trots, is a condition that often affects distance runners characterized by an urgent need for a bowel movement mid-run.

Causes
The causes of runner's diarrhea remain under debate, although several theories include ischemia and mechanical trauma. The reduced incidence of diarrhea in cyclists would indicate the latter. Diet is often cited as a common cause of diarrhea in distance runners, particularly with meals including berries and dried fruit.

Treatment 
Runner's diarrhea will normally clear up by itself from several hours to two days after running. As with all forms of diarrhea, replacement of fluids and electrolytes is advisable. Methods to prevent runner's diarrhea will vary between individuals, although it is advisable to consider examining the pre-running diet to determine potential trigger foods.

Notable cases
At the 1998 London Marathon, winner Catherina McKiernan suffered from recurrent diarrhea during the race.

At the 2008 Göteborgsvarvet half marathon, Mikael Ekvall finished the race in 21st place in spite of being stained with his own excrement. A reporter asked him if he had ever considered stopping to clean off. He explained: "No, I'd lose time. […] If you quit once, it's easy to do it again and again and again. It becomes a habit."

At the 2016 Summer Olympics – Men's 50 kilometres walk, Yohann Diniz led the race, but due to gastrointestinal issues, he fainted multiple times midrace. He was able to recover and finish in 8th place, six minutes behind the winner Matej Tóth, however he was disqualified immediately after finishing the race for drinking outside of designated hydration stations.

At the 2019 Perm International Marathon,  finished first despite suffering from a bout of diarrhea, which left his clothes sodden.

References

Diarrhea
Long-distance running